Karina Carvalho is an Australian journalist. She was born in Sri Lanka, and moved to Perth at the age of four. She is currently a presenter on the ABC News Channel, and also presents the late news on the ABC Monday to Wednesday, with Jeremy Fernandez presenting Thursday and Friday

Career
Carvalho graduated from the Western Australian Academy of Performing Arts with a Journalism major.

After work experience in Perth and Sydney she moved to the UK, where she did work experience with the BBC as a journalist and producer on programs such as HARDtalk, and on assignment to the US.

In 2006, Carvalho returned to Perth and in 2007 started work with the ABC, initially with casual work in the newsroom before being promoted to role of weekday presenter, following the resignation of Alicia Gorey.

In February 2012, Carvalho moved to Melbourne and co-hosted ABC News Breakfast on ABC 1 and ABC News 24 while Virginia Trioli was on maternity leave. She remained co-host until March 2013. She was one of the last journalists to interview the author Bryce Courtenay before his death and anchored coverage from Brisbane during the latest flood crisis.

In April 2013, Carvalho was appointed presenter of ABC News QLD replacing David Curnow.

In January 2018, Carvalho was appointed presenter of ABC Evening News on ABC News and relocated to Sydney. She was replaced on ABC News QLD by Matt Wordsworth.

References

 

 

 

ABC News (Australia) presenters
Australian television journalists
Living people
Australian people of Sri Lankan descent
Year of birth missing (living people)